The 1981–82 Hong Kong First Division League season was the 71st since its establishment.

League table

References
1981–82 Hong Kong First Division table (RSSSF)

Hong
Hong Kong First Division League seasons
1981–82 in Hong Kong football